Albert IV of Saxe-Lauenburg (1315 – 1343) was the eldest son of John II of Saxe-Lauenburg and Elisabeth of Holstein-Rendsburg (*ca. 1300–before 1340*), sister of Gerard III the Great. In 1321 Albert IV succeeded his father as Duke of Saxe-Bergedorf-Mölln, a branch duchy of Saxe-Lauenburg, while his mother served as regent, before she remarried Eric Christoffersen (*1307–1331*), a son of King Christopher II and co-ruler in Denmark.

Marriages and issue
Albert married twice, in 1334 (1) Beata of Schwerin (*?–before 1341*), daughter of Gunzelin VI, Count of Schwerin, and in 1341 (2) Sophia of Werle-Güstrow (*1329–5 September 1364*), daughter of Lord John II of Werle-Güstrow. Both wives also officiated as Saxon consorts. With Beata Albert had the following children: 
 John III (*mid-1330s–1356*)
 Albert V (*mid-1330s–1370*)
 Eric III (*mid-1330s–1401*).

 

|-

1315 births
1343 deaths
Albert 04
Albert 04